Pindal Canton is a canton of Ecuador, located in the Loja Province.  Its capital is the town of Pindal.  Its population at the 2001 census was 7,351.

References

Cantons of Loja Province